The Back in the Saddle Tour was a comeback concert tour by American rock group Aerosmith, which had been relatively inactive for several years. The tour began on June 22, 1984, in Concord, New Hampshire and ended on January 18, 1985, in Columbus, Ohio.

Background
Formed in 1970, Aerosmith was on hard times by the early 1980s. Vocalist Steven Tyler had been drinking heavily, and his voice had suffered.  Lead guitarist Joe Perry was addicted to heroin. The relationship between the two most prominent members of the band had deteriorated to "hostility".  Discussing his relationship with Perry, Tyler said "I hated his guts. I said 'I never want to fucking play on the same stage with you again'."

Joe Perry quit the band in 1979 and embarked on solo career with The Joe Perry Project. Guitarist Brad Whitford also quit to work with Derek St. Holmes and later joined Perry's band.  Most of Aerosmith's ventures without Perry and Whitford were unsuccessful.  Many fans believed that this was the end of Aerosmith.

Reunion
In 1983, the original band members "started drifting back together".  Perry had kicked his heroin habit, and although Tyler was still drinking, he was in somewhat better control of himself.  Tyler had concluded that "Time heals all wounds.  Joe is nothing without me, and I'm nothing without him."  They faced problems, however, as the "group had no current album or record deal."  To jump start their career, the band decided on a tour of the United States, considering as many as 70 performances. In its final form, the tour consisted of 58 performances.

Tour
Doubts were expressed as to whether Aerosmith could make a comeback.  "Cynics may suggest that the reunion dubbed the Back in the Saddle Tour is all the band has going for it.  Aerosmith hasn't had a new album in two years."

The tour consisted of two legs with a three-month break at the midpoint.  The tour "got a roar of approval from loyal fans", and it was described as "a rousing success".  The band's tour income was "estimated as high as $3 million".

Setlist
 "Rats In The Cellar"
 "Back In The Saddle"
 "Bone To Bone (Coney Island White Fish Boy)"
 "Big Ten Inch Record"
 "Movin' Out"
 "Last Child"
 "Let The Music Do The Talking" (On 12/31, Aerosmith performed the Joe Perry Project version)
 "Red House" "(The Jimi Hendrix Experience Cover)"
 "Dream On"
 "Sweet Emotion"
 "Same Old Song And Dance"

Encore:
 "Walk This Way"
 "Train Kept A-Rollin'"

Record contract
The success of the tour "piqued the interest" of Geffen Records and "resulted in a new deal with Geffen."

Legacy
The tour was "deemed a success". It did "what it was meant to do. Fans welcomed them back with open arms."  The tour "proved to be exactly what Aerosmith needed, launching the reunion on just the right note of organized mayhem."

Six of the eight tracks on the album Classics Live II were recorded at the Orpheum Theater in the band's home town of Boston on New Year's Eve, December 31, 1984 in the final weeks of the Back In The Saddle Tour.  This album has been called "far more worthy than its nondescript packaging suggested".

The band's successful career has continued for over 25 years after this comeback tour.

Tour dates

References

External links
 Aero Force One: Back In The Saddle Tour

1984 concert tours
1985 concert tours
Aerosmith concert tours
Reunion concert tours